Sir Henry Meux, 2nd Baronet (pronounced "Mews") (28 December 1817 – 1 January 1883), was head of Meux and Co., a London brewery, and a Member of Parliament (MP).

Early life
He was educated at Eton College and Christ Church, Oxford. On the death of his father on 7 April 1841, he succeeded to the baronetcy and took over the running of Meux's brewery off the Tottenham Court Road (later the Horse Shoe Brewery), which was at the time one of the largest producers of porter in London.

Career
He served as High Sheriff of Hertfordshire in 1845. He was then Conservative MP for Hertfordshire from 1847 to 1859.

By 1855 Meux began showing signs of mental decline and from 1858 he was bedbound with general paresis of the insane, now known to have been caused by tertiary syphilis. He refused to stand down at the March 1857 election and, despite his condition, the Conservatives decided to nominate him rather than risk a contest. He was returned unopposed and the party secured a pair for him for the entire session. On 3 July 1857 he amended his will to leave his entire estate to his wife. His disinherited sisters contested this change and in June 1858 the Commissioners in Lunacy considered whether he had been of sound mind at the time. Evidence of his occasional work and social activity later in 1857 caused the will to be upheld. 

After his insanity his business affairs were handled by trustees. In 1870 they bought an estate at East Overton, Wiltshire (now part of West Overton parish), and they later paid for the rebuilding of the parish church. From 1877 he was the owner of Dauntsey Park House, near Malmesbury in Wiltshire. His son Henry Bruce Meux took over the running of the brewery in 1878.

Personal life

He married Lady Louisa Caroline Brudenell-Bruce on 19 January 1856, the eldest daughter of Ernest Brudenell-Bruce, 3rd Marquess of Ailesbury and his wife, the former Hon. Louisa Elizabeth Horsley-Beresford (daughter of John Horsley-Beresford, 2nd Baron Decies). Together, they were the parents of:

 Sir Henry Bruce Meux, 3rd Baronet (1856–1900), who married socialite Valerie Langdon in 1878.

Sir Henry died on 1 January 1883. His widow, Lady Louisa, died in December 1894.

References

External links
 

|-

1817 births
1883 deaths
Meux, Henry, 2nd Baronet
High Sheriffs of Hertfordshire
Conservative Party (UK) MPs for English constituencies
UK MPs 1847–1852
UK MPs 1852–1857
UK MPs 1857–1859
People educated at Eton College
Alumni of Christ Church, Oxford
Members of the Parliament of the United Kingdom for Hertfordshire